Jean Bredenkamp (born 12 January 1993) is a South African cricketer who played for Boland. He is a right-handed batsman and right-arm medium-fast bowler. Bredenkamp made his first-class debut on 10 March 2011 against Gauteng.

In October 2017, he made his career-best score in List A cricket, with 164 not out, batting for Namibia against Boland in the 2017–18 CSA Provincial One-Day Challenge.

In January 2018, he was named in Namibia's squad for the 2018 ICC World Cricket League Division Two tournament. In March 2019, he was named in Namibia's squad for the 2019 ICC World Cricket League Division Two tournament.

In June 2019, he was one of twenty-five cricketers to be named in Cricket Namibia's Elite Men's Squad ahead of the 2019–20 international season.

References

External links
Jean Bredenkamp profile at CricketArchive

1993 births
Living people
Cricketers from Pretoria
South African cricketers
Namibian cricketers
Boland cricketers